Mother, May I Sleep with Danger? is a 2016 American television thriller film directed by Melanie Aitkenhead, written by Amber Coney, and starring James Franco (who conceived the story), Emily Meade, Tori Spelling, Leila George, Ivan Sergei, Nick Eversman, Emma Rigby, Amber Coney and Christie Lynn Smith. It is a remake of the 1996 film Mother, May I Sleep with Danger?, but with a vampire theme as well as original actors Tori Spelling and Ivan Sergei in different roles. The film premiered on Lifetime on June 18, 2016.

Plot
It all starts one night when a girl named Pearl (Emily Meade) is invited to the house of a girl (Emma Rigby). She turns out to be a Nightwalker, a type of vampire that can not be harmed in daylight in their human form. After Pearl is bitten and stabs the girl in the heart, she starts to transform into a Nightwalker as the Nightwalker Queen (Zoe Sidel) and her minions give her a captive human as her first meal.

Sometime later, a college girl named Leah (Leila George) is working on a play run by its director (James Franco) and befriends Pearl and falls in love with her much to the dismay of her mother Julie (Tori Spelling). Leah learns that Pearl is a Nightwalker. Pearl's Nightwalker group that preys on abusive men and forcibly inducts women into their group by biting and then not eating them. The Nightwalker Queen has her sights set on Leah as the next member and wants Pearl to bite her, threatening to bite her herself if Pearl doesn't comply. There is a sexual component to biting, as is discussed in a thematic English class' discussion of vampire novels Dracula and Twilight, characterizing the threat as one of rape.

Julie tries to get Leah interested in dating a man named Bob Segal (Nick Eversman) who she knows to be attracted to Leah. Bob feels entitled to Leah as a long-time friend and is upset when Leah indicates contrary interest in women as a lesbian. He conspires with Julie to expose Pearl as a bad person to win Leah's heart. When this is ineffective, he spikes her drink with a date rape drug and attempts to rape her. The Nightwalkers attack him and start to eat him, but are interrupted allowing him to transform into a Nightwalker.

Now given enhanced abilities, Bob leads the Nightwalkers in an assault of Leah which disrupts the play she is in. Julie follows them to the graveyard and is killed by Bob when trying to rescue her. Leah takes vengeance by bludgeoning Bob to apparent death. Pearl apparently kills the other Nightwalkers by ripping the throat of one of them and blinding the other. After getting far away, Pearl states that she can protect Leah. A mourning Leah doesn't want that and asks her to turn her into a Nightwalker so that they can be together for eternity. Pearl does so and Leah becomes a Nightwalker.

One year later, the Nightwalker gang is still active and heavily scarred where they are now influenced by Bob as they enter a Halloween party.

Cast
 James Franco as Play Director
 Emily Meade as Pearl
 Tori Spelling as Julie Lewisohn
 Leila George as Leah Lewisohn
 Ivan Sergei as Teacher
 Nick Eversman as Bob Segal
 Zoe Sidel as Nightwalker Queen
 Emma Rigby as Nightwalker
 Gabrielle Haugh as Nightwalker
 Amber Coney as Sonté
 Taylor Laughlin
 Hadley Winn as Violet 
 Christie Lynn Smith as Coral

Reception
The review consensus at Rotten Tomatoes for Mother, May I Sleep with Danger? had 62% of critics recommending the film, based on 13 reviews and an average rating of 5.4 out of 10. Mother, May I Sleep with Danger? was met with mixed reviews from critics noted at review aggregator Metacritic. This release received a weighted average score of 46 out of 100, based on 10 reviews. Sam Adams of Rolling Stone wrote a mostly favorable review, commenting that the film was "junk that knows it's junk" and that its "great feat is that it's a movie that manages to be both exploitative and progressive, in the way that Russ Meyer's movies feature strong female role models and also provide ample opportunity to peer down the front of busty young women's blouses." Daniel Fienberg of The Hollywood Reporter wrote that the film took itself too seriously in its first portion but that its third act "kicks into gear".

References

External links
 

2016 films
2016 crime thriller films
2016 television films
American crime thriller films
American LGBT-related television films
American vampire films
Crime television films
Lesbian-related films
LGBT-related thriller films
American thriller television films
Vampires in television
Lifetime (TV network) films
2010s English-language films
2010s American films
Films based on novels